The Baptism River is an  river of the U.S. state of Minnesota. The river source is the confluence of the East Branch Baptism River and the West Branch Baptism River just south of the community of Finland.

The High Falls on the Pigeon River is higher, but is on the border with Ontario.

Habitat
The Baptism River is a designated trout stream with populations of brook, brown and rainbow trout, as well as Chinook salmon.

See also
List of rivers of Minnesota

References

External links

Rivers of Minnesota
Rivers of Lake County, Minnesota
Tributaries of Lake Superior
Northern Minnesota trout streams